The 2008–2009 UCI Cyclo-cross World Cup events and season-long competition took place between 19 October 2008 and 25 January 2009 and is sponsored by the Union Cycliste Internationale (UCI). Nine events were organised, the same as the 2007–2008 UCI Cyclo-cross World Cup, although the events in Liévin and Hoogerheide were replaced with Nommay, a former World Cup race, and Roubaix, which was first held in 2006. Hoogerheide hosts the 2009 UCI Cyclo-cross World Championships.

Events

See also
 2008–2009 Cyclo-cross Superprestige
 2008–2009 Cyclo-cross Gazet van Antwerpen

External links
 Official website

World Cup
World Cup
UCI Cyclo-cross World Cup